Ranzovius clavicornis is a species of plant bug in the family Miridae. It is found in North America. It scavenges dead insects for food, and can be found inhabiting the webs of Anelosimus studiosus, stealing the spider's prey.

References

Further reading

 
 

Phylini
Articles created by Qbugbot
Insects described in 1927